Taranta may refer to:

 Taranta Peligna, Italian comune in Abruzzo
 Taranta, parish in Italian comune Cassano d'Adda, in Lombardia
 Taranta, 2012 album by Mina Tindle
 Taranta, a Lenny Breau song included on the 1968 album Guitar Sounds from Lenny Breau
 Tarantas, a style of flamenco music 
 Agapornis taranta, scientific name of the parrot Black-winged lovebird
 Notte della Taranta, Italian music festival in Salento
 Super Taranta!, album by Gogol Bordello

See also 
 Taranto, southern Italian city
 Tarantella, southern Italian dance
 Tarantass, a four-wheeled horse-drawn vehicle